The Montmartre Funicular is an inclined transport system serving the Montmartre neighbourhood of Paris, France, in the 18th arrondissement. Operated by the RATP, the Paris transport authority, the system opened in 1900; it was entirely rebuilt in 1935 and again in 1991.

The system is a funicular in name only. Its formal title, the Montmartre Funicular, is a vestige of its earlier configuration, where its cars operated in a counterbalanced, interconnected pair, always moving in opposite directions in concert, thus meeting the definition of a funicular. The system now uses two independently operating cars that can each ascend or descend on demand, qualifying as a double inclined elevator, retaining the term funicular in its title as a historical reference.

The system carries passengers between the base of Montmartre and its summit, accessing the nearby Sacré-Cœur basilica and paralleling the adjacent staircases of Rue Foyatier. The  cars climbs  in under a minute and a half and carry two million passengers a year.

Current design
Constructed by the Schindler Group, the system with electrical traction entered service on 1 June 1991. It has a capacity of  passengers per hour in each direction.

The technology of the Montmartre line differs from a funicular in that it uses independently operating cars more related to standard up-down elevators, each equipped with its own counterweight. Again, a funicular's cars are by definition arranged in counterbalanced, interconnected pairs, moving in concert. The Montmartre system now allows each car to function independently, with its own hoist and cables. Advantages of this arrangement include the ability of one car to remain in service during maintenance of the other. Also, both cabins can ascend simultaneously (usually, more passengers use the system to ascend than to descend), where cars of a funicular always travel in opposite directions.

The see-through stations were designed by architect François Deslaugiers and the cabins were designed by Roger Tallon, who also designed the carriages of the TGV Atlantique. The cabin roofs are partly glazed, allowing a view during transit.

The system operates daily from 6 am until 12.45 am, transporting  people a day, or around 2 million annually.

History 

The Paris city government voted to construct the Montmartre transport system in 1891. Initially, operation was subcontracted to Decauville through a concession that ended in 1931.

The original system in contrast to the current system was, in fact, a funicular with twin counterbalanced and interconnected cars. In the case of the Montmartre design, a system of onboard water bladders of  could be filled or emptied to move the cars and to compensate for passenger load. In 1935, the system was converted to electricity. The system was completely rebuilt by the RATP in 1990–1991, as dual independently operating inclined elevators.

The system was shut down after a minor accident during tests by the RATP in December 2006.  It reopened in July 2007.

Chronology 
 5 June 1891: Decision to create a funicular at Montmartre
 12 or 13 July 1900: Inauguration of the first water-driven funicular
 1 November 1931: Closure of the water-driven funicular
 2 February 1935: Opening of the electric funicular
 1 October 1990: Closure of the funicular for the second renovation
 5 October 1991: Opening of the modern inclined elevator, retaining the name funicular
 7 December 2006: Accident during a brake load test, without passengers

Origins 

Construction of the Montmartre transport system was authorized by the Paris municipal council in 1891. It was built to serve the Sacré-Cœur Basilica at the summit of the outlier of Montmartre and was inaugurated on 5 June 1891. Original plans specified electrical traction and six stations between two termini. As built, the system used only two terminal stations and water-filled bladders as counterweights for motion.

The funicular entered service on 12 or 13 July (sources vary), and its operation was ceded to the Decauville company with a contract lasting until 1931. However, lacking the necessary authorisation from the Paris Prefecture of Police to run the service, the company had to close the funicular from 24 November 1900 until 22 May 1901.

The funicular was of double track at standard gauge, using the Strub rack system for braking. The rails were supported by sleepers made of structural steel, supported on concrete pedestals.

The system was powered by two sealed water tanks/bladders with a capacity of  located under the floor of each cabin. The tanks of one cabin were refilled at the upper station, allowing its descent under gravity with the combined weight of the passengers and water, enabling the other carriage to ascend. A steam engine situated at the lower station worked the filling pumps at the upper station. The cabins held forty-eight passengers in four closed compartments arranged like a staircase; the two end platforms were reserved for the driver and brakeman. These were retained for a brake system established on the rack railway. This system transported a million passengers a year for some thirty years.

First renovation, 1931 

The rack system was deemed too dangerous and so the initial system was shut down; operations ceased on 1 November 1931. The water-driven system was replaced by two electrically driven cabins and reopened on 2 February 1935 after an interruption of more than three years. The cabins were no longer arranged like a staircase but composed of a single compartment with a horizontal floor.

By 1955, the line was in service from 7 am until 9 pm in winter and until 11 pm in summer, entry to the station being made by cancelling a bus ticket. In 1962, the funicular transported  passengers and operations were suspended for some weeks for a new renovation.

Second renovation, 1991 
After fifty-five years of operation, transporting two million passengers annually, the system was in need of renovation. An idea was proposed by the RATP and the Mairie de Paris, to lengthen the line with a tunnel to the Anvers métro station. The idea was abandoned due to high cost.

The RATP entirely rebuilt the funicular in 1990–1991. The old stations were demolished and rebuilt as designed by architect François Deslaugiers. The works were undertaken by Schindler Group, a lift manufacturer, and cost 43.1 million francs.

Since its latest renovation, the system uses angled lift technology with electrical traction. It is no longer a funicular but retains the term in reflection of its history. The system no longer functions with the requisite interconnected and counterbalanced arrangement of a funicular (where cabins always move in opposite directions, the descending cabin counterweighing the ascending one). The machinery is located in the higher station; it is composed of two totally independent winches powered by  motors. The cabins each weigh  unladen,  when full. They have a service brake and an emergency brake. The carriages and chassis were made by Skirail, and the electrics by Poma.

Operation is entirely automatic: The presence and number of passengers are detected by a system combining electronic balance scales mounted in the cabin floor, and radar in the stations. A computer determines the cabin's departure, indicated with a display board in the cabin. For safety, the platform edge doors open only when a cabin is present, as on the Paris Métro Line 14 and some stations on London's Jubilee line.
 
On 7 December 2006 at 5.50 pm, a cabin crashed down the slope during a brake system test by RATP. The terminal of the lifting cable broke. One of the two cabins was put back in service on 30 June 2007, the other on 2 August 2008.

Operation 
 

The funicular is considered to be part of the Paris Métro network, and so has similar pricing. The two stations each have turnstiles which can read magnetic tickets and Navigo passes. They thus allow access via all RATP payment methods, including the single-journey Ticket "t", Paris Visite combination transport/museum pass and other RATP weekly and monthly passes.

There is no direct transport interchange, except with the "Montmartrobus" which has a stop in the Rue du Cardinal-Dubois in front of the upper station and offers a free interchange.

The funicular is considered a special line not coming under the Ticket T+ fare rules for interchanges; a passenger coming from the Métro with an already-cancelled Ticket T+ must use a second ticket for the funicular, and vice versa.

The  ("Allocation codes") of the lower and upper stations are respectively 31-02 and 31-03. Code 31 corresponds to the Quartier Pigalle, or FUNB and FUNH.

Finance 
The RATP finances the line's operation (maintenance, infrastructure and cost of personnel). Fares are set by political decisions which do not cover the true cost of transportation. It defines the general conditions of operation and the duration and frequency of services. Public bodies also contribute.

Projects 
Given the interest in the technical solution provided by the funicular for public passenger transport over relatively short and extremely steep routes, studies have called for the RATP to build similar systems, notably at Issy-les-Moulineaux, in the renovation project of the Fort d'Issy quarter, and to link the Meudon-sur-Seine station on Paris Tramway Line 2 with the Gare de Bellevue, which would recreate the old Bellevue funicular at Meudon, demolished in 1934.

Popular culture
The funicular is an essential element in Paris life, and thus appears in many films and television series having Montmartre as a theme.

In the first pilot episode of the police series , a chase takes place on the Rue Foyatier steps alongside the funicular, just like in the classic film Céline et Julie vont en bateau (1974, Jacques Rivette); in the pilot, the character played by Jean-Pierre Castaldi runs up it to catch the crooks. Similarly in the film  (2009), Michel Fernandez (Thierry Frémont) flees by the stairs, chased by Nora Chahyd (Rachida Brakni) who takes the funicular.

Jean-Pierre Melville opened his film  (1956) with a tracking shot around the Montmartre quarter where the film is set, and voiceover then says " [shot over the Basilique du Sacré-Coeur]  [bird's eye view of the funicular descending, with music ]  [Shot of the Place Pigalle]" ("It is at one and the same time heaven ... and ... hell").

The funicular figures in an eponymous work by Jean Marchand (1883–1940), on view at the Musée d'Art Moderne de la Ville de Paris. It appears in literature in a short story by Boileau-Narcejac titled  ("The enigma of the funicular"), published in 1971 in the review , and also in the works of Jacques Charpentreau who, in a poem entitled , compares the cabins to two contrary brothers:  ("When one flies into the air, the other falls to the ground/ And la, la la").

In October 2006, at the request of the website  for its "" ("concerts to download"), the singer Cali made an appearance in one of the funicular's cabins surrounded by passengers, singing her song  ("The end of the world in ten minutes") from the album  as it ascended.
The funicular also appears in the 2011 3D computer generated animated film, A Monster in Paris.

See also 

 Funicular
 Inclined railway
 List of funicular railways
 List of Paris metro stations
 Montmartre
 RATP

References

Sources

External links
Virtual tour in 360 degrees Use the mouse to turn around.

Funicular railways in France
Rail transport in Paris
Buildings and structures in the 18th arrondissement of Paris
Railway lines opened in 1900
RATP Group
Montmartre
Former water-powered funicular railways converted to electricity
Standard gauge railways in France
Inclined elevators